Abraham Abele Gombiner (c. 1635 – 5 October 1682), known as the Magen Avraham, born in Gąbin (Gombin), Poland, was a rabbi, Talmudist and a leading religious authority in the Jewish community of Kalisz, Poland during the seventeenth century. His full name is Avraham Abele ben Chaim HaLevi from the town of Gombin. There are texts that list his family name as Kalisz after the city of his residence.  After his parents were killed in the Chmielnicki massacres of 1648, he moved to live and study with his relative in Leszno, Jacob Isaac Gombiner. From there he moved to Kalisz where he was appointed as Rosh Yeshiva and judge in the tribunal of Rabbi Israel Spira (who was a son of Rabbi Nathan Nata Spira). 

He is known to scholars of Judaism for his Magen Avraham commentary on the Orach Chayim section of Rabbi Joseph Karo's Shulchan Aruch, which he began writing in 1665 and finished in 1671.  His brother Yehudah traveled in 1673 to Amsterdam to print the work, but did not have the needed funds, and died on the journey.  It was not published until 1692 by Shabbethai Bass in Dyhernfurth after Rabbi Gombiner's death.  His son Chaim wrote in the preface to the work that his father was frequently sick and suffered pain and discomfort.

Works
His most important work was Magen Avraham, a commentary on Shulchan Aruch, Orach Hayyim. It is not to be confused with works by the same title by Abraham Farissol and Avraham the magid of Trisk.

He also wrote Zayit Ra'anan, a commentary on the popular midrashic collection Yalkut Shimoni.

He also authored a commentary to the works of the Tosefta on the section of Nezikin in the Talmud, published by his grandson together with the work by R. Abraham's son-in-law Moshe Yekutiel Kaufman, Lehem Hapanim (1732).

He wrote a commentary on the Torah entitled Shemen Sason, but much of it has been lost.

Magen Avraham

Debate over name of the book
Gombiner's son Chaim named the book Magen Avraham, using his father's name in the title. His father's students mentioned to him that they asked his father how he will name his book and he answered Ner Yisrael ("Lamp of Israel") (abbreviation: נר יפה של רבי אברהם הלוי) . Apparently, because of humility he did not want to integrate his name in the book. However, his son wanted to perpetuate his father's name in the title by linking it to the commentary of the Taz - Magen David, so he published his father's work under the title Magen Avraham.

Aaron Worms criticized him for titling the book with a traditional title for God and referencing the closing of the first blessing in the Amidah. However, Chaim Michael states that there is no basis for his critique and its all empty talk.

Halakhah, minhag, custom
Gombiner's innovative approach to commenting on the Shulchan Aruch was to incorporate the customs of his contemporary Poland.  The work is terse and difficult and needed explanation by later commentators.  His lasting effect on halakhah was the incorporation of the Kabbalistic customs of Safed, especially those found in Rabbi Isaiah Horowitz's Shene Luhot Haberit.

He taught that customs should be respected.  In the case of the blessing of "giving strength to the weary" he writes that one does not undo an old custom, and believed that opponents like Rabbi Yosef Karo likely repented of changing minhag at the end of his life.

Dealing with the widespread practice of hiring gentiles to work for the community on the Sabbath, he wrote, "they allow themselves to hire a Gentile under contract to remove the garbage from the streets, and the Gentile does the work on the Sabbath." He assumed that a prior rabbi had approved the action "and we must conclude that a great rabbi handed down this ruling" for the sake of the community.

Regarding the universal practice of not giving people who claim to be Kohanim priority in many cases (such as not taking food first) he said it is most likely because modern-day Kohanim do not have any proper proof of their pedigree.

He taught that aliyot should be given based on events in congregants' lives, such as marriage, birth and death, rather than always giving it to the scholars.

He taught that "women are exempt from counting the omer, since it is a positive time-bound commandment".  Nonetheless, they have already made it obligatory upon themselves."

He held that one child can count for a minyan for the Torah reading. Some modern rabbis wish to extrapolate from this opinion to include counting women for a minyan in a Partnership Minyan, while others disagree. This controversial point is discussed in recent responsa.

While usually giving his imprimatur to local customs, in the case of the custom to donate firecrackers and fireworks to the synagogue in honour of Simchat Torah, Rabbi Gombiner believed it proof of the effect of allowing boorish commoners to celebrate a scholars' holiday.

Influence
The Magen Avraham was the subject of a commentary by Samuel Neta HaLevi of Kolin, entitled Mahatsit ha-shekel, 
and another by David Solomon Eibenschutz, entitled Levushei Serad.

R. Yechiel Michel Epstein’s Aruch HaShulchan and R. Yisrael Meir Kagan’s Mishnah Berurah relied on Gombiner for their acceptance of Kabbalistic practices.

There is a major dispute in the 17-18th century  as to how to figure Rabbinic hours of the day. 
One approach (that of Gombiner, in his Magen Avraham) reckons the day from dawn until nightfall.
The other approach (that of the Vilna Gaon) reckons the day from sunrise to sunset.
For rituals, which are prescribed in the morning, Magen Avraham's calculations will always be earlier than that of the Vilna Gaon. For rituals, which are prescribed in the afternoon or evening, Magen Avraham's calculations will always be later than that of the Vilna Gaon.

Notable Descendants
 Rabbi Chaim Pinchas Lubinsky
 Shlomo Zemach

Bibliography
Jacob, Katz The "Shabbes Goy": A Study in Halakhic Flexibility Jewish Publication Society, 1989
Chayyim Tchernowitz, Toldot Haposkim 3: 164-172.
J. Wrescher, Introduction to Shemen Sason (2000).

References

External links
Jewish Encyclopedia entry
his work on Tosefte, Amsterdam 1732
biography by Mordechai Margulies (in Hebrew)

1635 births
1682 deaths
17th-century Polish rabbis
People from Kalisz
Authors of books on Jewish law
People from Gąbin